Empress Niohuru may refer to:

 Empress Xiaozhaoren (1659–1678), wife of the Kangxi Emperor
 Empress Xiaoshengxian (1692–1777), concubine of the Yongzheng Emperor who became an empress dowager
 Empress Xiaoherui (1776–1850), wife of the Jiaqing Emperor
 Empress Xiaoquancheng (1808–1840), wife of the Daoguang Emperor
 Empress Dowager Ci'an (1837–1881), wife of the Xianfeng Emperor

See also
 Empress Xiaomucheng (1781–1808), wife of the Daoguang Emperor before he took the throne

Niohuru